Wild Himalaya: A Natural History of the Greatest Mountain Range on Earth is a nonfiction book by Stephen Alter.

Background 
This book details the author's journeys to all five countries traversed by the Himalayas: India, Pakistan, Bhutan, Nepal, and China.

Reception 
Shyam Saran writes for the Business Standard, "Across nearly 400 densely packed pages, grouped in eight sections and 50 chapters, Alter turns biographer, narrating the incredible tale of the mountain range, almost in stream of consciousness style, mixing science with legend, history with myths, and personal affinity with how others have related to its varied landscape of intense fecundity and frozen desolation."

In a review for The Hindu, the deputy editor of Frontline Anusua Mukherjee writes, "Wild Himalaya is about entities that are the antithesis of the wild, at least theoretically — the state and the military."

Writing for The Indian Express, environmentalist and bird watcher Ranjit Lal in his review suggest that "Stephen Alter’s exhaustive biography of the Himalayas is an exceptional tribute to the world’s mightiest mountains."

Awards and nominations 
 The Himalayan Club's 2020 Kekoo Naoroji Award.

References 

Travel books
Himalayan studies
2019 non-fiction books
Aleph Book Company books